Stories of the Sylvanian Families is a children's television series directed by Jo and Martin Pullen, and produced by FilmFair. It is the second animated series based on the Sylvanian Families media franchise, and the only one animated in stop motion. It premiered on British television in 1988. There are four episodes, each narrated by Bernard Cribbins.

Stories of the Sylvanian Families introduced three new families who don't occur in the 1987 animated series or the 2007 animated series.

All four episodes were released on VHS video cassette by Abbey Broadcast Communications Plc in 1999.

Characters
 The Babblebrooks (grey rabbits): Grandfather Cliff, Grandmother Pearl, Father Rocky, Mother Crystal, Brother Bubba, Sister Breezy, Baby Sandy and Baby Coral
 The Evergreens (grey bears): Grandfather Ernest, Grandmother Primrose, Father Forrest, Mother Honeysuckle, Older Brother Logan, Older Sister Summer, Brother Preston, Sister Ashley, Baby Dusty and Baby Poppy
 The McBurrows (moles): Father Digger, Mother Heidi, Brother Muddy, Sister Molly, Baby Monty and Baby Mo
 The Oakwoods (squirrels): Father Ollie, Mother Betsy, Brother Barnaby, Sister Bluebell, Baby Abbie and Baby Acorn
 The Slydales (foxes): Father Slick, Mother Velvette, Brother Buster, Sister Scarlett, Baby Skitter and Baby Lindy
 The Thistlethorns (mice): Father Chester, Mother Willow, Brother Lester, Sister Prissy, Baby Barry and Baby Heather
 The Timbertops (brown bears): Grandfather Gus, Grandmother Fern, Father Taylor, Mother Rose, Older Brother Birch, Older Sister Ivy, Brother Bud, Sister Daisy, Baby Burl and Baby Blossom
 The Treefellows (owls): Father Aristotle, Mother Arabella, Baby Winky, Baby Blinky and Baby Grumpy
 The Waters (beavers): Father Wade, Mother Nancy, Brother Roger, Sister Misty, Baby Bucky and Baby Bubbles
 The Wildwoods (brown rabbits): Grandfather Smokey, Grandmother Flora, Father Herb, Mother Ginger, Brother Rusty, Sister Hollie, Baby Barkley and Baby Juniper

Episodes

References

1980s British animated television series
1988 British television series debuts
1988 British television series endings
Animated television series about families
British children's animated fantasy television series
English-language television shows
British stop-motion animated television series
Television series by FilmFair
Television series by DHX Media
Television shows based on toys